Malina Stancheva Stancheva (Bulgarian: Малина Станчева Станчева) or Malina (Bulgarian: Малина),(born 7 June 1967) is a Bulgarian Chalga (pop-folk) singer.

Studio albums 
Огнена звезда (2001)
 Да или не
 Огнена звезда
 Към теб вървя
 Луда светлина
 Между ад и рай
 Музика
 Не е грях
 Нежна любов
 Дива страст
 Само ти
 Любовната стрела
 Горски плод
 Хай-ли-ли
 Болка

Malina (2003)
 Леден свят
 Само ме обичай
 Тръгвам си
 Кажи обичам те
 Любовта е...
 Само миг (ремикс)
 Само ме обичай (ремикс)
 Обичам лудо
 Две очи
 Не плачи, замълчи
 Остани
 Само миг

Compilations 

Златните хитове на Пайнер 10 - Malina (2013) 
 Двойници
 Всякакви мъже
 Какво направи с мен
 Има кой
 Още палиш
 Не знаеш (дует с Азис)
 Ситуация
 Най-красивата (дует с Азис)
 Само тази нощ
 Страст

Video albums 
Malina Best Video Selection 1 (2003)
 Само ти
 Ne ye gryakh
 Ognena zvezda
 Diva strast
 Ne plachi,zam"lchi
 Da ili ne (remiks)
 Muzika (remiks)
 YEla
 Obicham ludo
 Samo mig
 Leden svyat
 Obicham ludo (live)

Malina Best Video Selection 2 (2007)
 Oshche palish
 Strast
 Drug p"t
 Stud
 Iskam, iskam (duyet s Azis)
 Neka da ne znam
 V tishinata
 Chernite ochi (duyet s Azis)
 Samo tazi noshch
 Kakvo napravi s men
 Ne znayesh (duyet s Azis)
 Miks lyatno turne 2007

References

1967 births
Living people
Bulgarian folk-pop singers
Payner artists